Blue Team may refer to:

Blue Team (Czech politics), a Civic Democratic Party project
Blue Team, the "friendly" side in a wargame/military simulation; see red team
Blue Team (U.S. politics), the American anti-China political lobby
Blue Team (bridge), the Italian bridge team
Blue team (computer security)
The NASA Mission Control team; see John Hodge (engineer)
The Italy national American football team, nicknamed "Blue Team"
Blue Team, an X-Men strike force
Sub-unit of the SPARTAN special-ops forces in the Halo universe